Suckermouth catfish may refer to:

 Any species of armored catfish (family Loricariidae), most notably:
 Hypostomus plecostomus, and Hypostomus punctatus, two species of armored catfish popular with aquarists
 Any similar species marketed under the name "plecostomus" or "pleco"
  Sailfin suckermouth, usually Pterygoplichthys gibbiceps